The World Scrabble Championship 2005 was held in the Marriott Regent's Park Hotel, London, England between 16 November and 20 November. The winner was Adam Logan of Canada.

As in previous years, the tournament began with a 24-round Swiss tournament over three days. The top two players from this phase contested a best-of-five final.

Results
The preliminary stage involved 102 players over 24 rounds, using the "Chew Pairing" system to select the draw for each round.

Adam Logan beat Pakorn Nemitrmansuk of Thailand 3–0 in the final. Notably, Nemitrmansuk was also the runner-up finalist at WSC 2003.

Adam won the first game 524–409. Pakorn bingoed EDACIOUS, GRINDER and VALETiNG while Adam could only manage one (STATURE) until he ended the game with a rare triple-triple TWISTIeR, which clinched it for him as Pakorn ran out of time.

Adam won the second game 520-316 with bingoes RIBANDS, GNaRRED, CLOGGER and ELODEAS while Pakorn managed CATTAILS and VAUNTIER, and lost points on letters and time once again.

Adam won the third game 465-426 to clinch the title. Bingoes from Adam were AURATES, REcOINED, ANCOnES and from Pakorn were TEAMING and BIRSLED.

This was the fourth time in eight events that a Canadian had won, including one year in which a Canadian played for the United States.

Complete results

FINALS:
Game 1: Adam 524 – Pakorn 409
Game 2: Adam 520 – Pakorn 316
Game 3: Adam 465 – Pakorn 426

Participants
Places were allocated by country. The number of places per country was:

U.S., 15 places
England, 10 places
Canada, 7 places
New Zealand, 5 places
Australia, 4 places
Kenya, 4 places
Thailand, 4 places
Ghana, 3 places
Philippines, 3 places
Nigeria, 3 places
Singapore, 3 places
Sri Lanka, 3 places
Bahrain, 2 places
India, 2 places
Israel, 2 places
Japan, 2 places
Malaysia, 2 places
Malta, 2 places
Oman, 2 places
Pakistan, 2 places
Scotland, 2 places
South Africa, 2 places
Wales, 2 places
Cameroon, 1 place
France, 1 place
Gibraltar, 1 place
Guyana, 1 place
Indonesia, 1 place
Ireland, 1 place
Kurdistan-Iraq, 1 place
Kuwait, 1 place
Poland, 1 place
Romania, 1 place
Saudi Arabia, 1 place
Seychelles, 1 place
Sweden, 1 place
Tanzania, 1 place
Trinidad, 1 place
U.A.E., 1 place
Uganda, 1 place
Zambia, 1 place

Panupol Sujjayakorn qualified automatically as defending World Champion, and so did not count towards Thailand's quota.

References

External links
Official site

2005
2005 in the United Kingdom
2005 in London
Scrabble in the United Kingdom